The 1941 Texas Tech Red Raiders football team was an American football team that represented Texas Tech University as a member of the Border Conference during the 1941 college football season. In their first season under head coach Dell Morgan, the Red Raiders compiled a 9–2 record (2–0 against conference opponents), lost to Tulsa in the 1942 Sun Bowl, and outscored opponents by a total of 226 to 36. The team shut out six opponents, allowed only 3.3 points per game, and ranked second ranked in scoring defense among 119 major college teams during the 1941 season. The team did not play sufficient number of games against conference opponents to qualify for the conference championship.  Home games were played at Tech Field in Lubbock, Texas.

Quarterback Tyrus Bain and fullback Charles Dvoracek were selected by the conference coaches as second-team players on the 1941 All-Border Conference football team.

Schedule

References

Texas Tech
Texas Tech Red Raiders football seasons
Texas Tech Red Raiders football